Manatee Mineral Springs Park (formerly Indian Springs Park) is a neighborhood park located in Bradenton, Florida. The park is named after a natural spring at the location. The park is one of the region's oldest parks and is now a gateway to the city's Riverwalk eastern expansion. The park is a public–private partnership that is open to public use.

History

Over many centuries, people who traveled or hunted or settled along the nearby section of the Manatee River took water from the spring.

The park was designated in 2018 as a site on the Underground Railroad Network to Freedom. This recognizes that the spring was used by individuals who had escaped slavery and lived near the spring between the end of the 1700s and when Florida became a territory in 1821. Angola was destroyed by a massive slave raid in early 1821; some escaped to the Florida interior or the Bahamas.

The park was re-landscaped and dedicated in 2022. A new feature of the park is a hand pump that pulls water from the spring onto a relief map of the Manatee River. The park has picnic tables and a small gazebo. A boardwalk extends into the Manatee River. 

The park adjoins the Reflections of Manatee Historic Complex at the Curry Houses Historic District. In January 2020, the City of Bradenton funded excavations that recovered evidence of Angola and the early Manatee Settlement. Reflections of Manatee led that project and exhibits the artifacts that were recovered.

A Florida State Historical Marker at the park commemorates the early Anglo-American settlement of Manatee that grew up around the spring. Three Spanish fisherman guided Josiah Gates, Manatee's first white settler, to this spot in late 1841. In 1842 Henry and Ellen Clark acquired the spring property and built the town's first trading post.

In 2006, the park's natural spring was designated a "Florida Natural Spring" by the Florida Geological Survey of Natural Springs.

References

Baram, Uzi. "Cosmopolitan Meanings of Old Spanish Fields: Historical Archaeology of a Maroon Community in Southwest Florida" Historical Archaeology 46(1):108-122. 2012
Baram, Uzi "Many Histories by the Manatee Mineral Spring" Time Sifters Archaeology Society Newsletter March 2014 http://files.ctctcdn.com/d1e1db8f001/28309dee-6a81-46f1-967f-d511065af014.pdf

Parks in Florida
Parks in Manatee County, Florida
Bradenton, Florida
Springs of Florida
1842 establishments in Florida Territory